Sonja Kolačarić (born 4 May 1980) is a Serbian actress. She is known for her roles in films such as Nebeska udica and Tears for Sale.

Career 
Sonja Kolačarić made her debut in 1999 film Sky Hook, directed by Ljubiša Samardžić and starring Nebojša Glogovac, Nikola Đuričko and Nikola Kojo. She then made cameo appearances in films The White Suit in 1999, Srbokap in 2000, and Zapečen. In 2002 Kolačarić co–starred with Nikola Đuričko in the film Mrtav 'ladan, and also appeared in film 1 na 1. After minor appearances in the films E-Snuff in 2003, Slatki miris naftalina in 2004 and Snajper in 2006, and work in theatre plays, Kolačarić appeared in a leading role in the 2008 film Tears for Sale, starring alongside Katarina Radivojević. She has also appeared on television, in the series Poslednja audijencija and in a leading role in Ono kao ljubav.

Filmography

References

External links 
 

1980 births
Living people
Serbian film actresses
Serbian stage actresses
Serbian television actresses